Who Was That Lady? is a 1960 black and white American comedy film directed by George Sidney and starring Tony Curtis, Dean Martin, and Janet Leigh.

The movie was made by Ansark-Sidney, distributed by Columbia Pictures and produced by Norman Krasna, who also wrote the screenplay based on his successful Broadway play Who Was That Lady I Saw You With? The costume design was by Jean Louis. The title song was written by Sammy Cahn.

Dean Martin received a Golden Globe award nomination for his performance in Who Was That Lady?, which also was nominated for Best Comedy.

Plot
Ann Wilson catches her strait-laced husband, Columbia University Assistant Professor of Chemistry David Wilson, kissing another woman.  From David's perspective, he was the one being kissed innocently, the woman in question being a grateful transfer student.  However, Ann wants a divorce.  On the advice of David's friend, TV writer Michael Haney, David tries to convince Ann that he is really an FBI agent, and that the kiss was all in the name of national security.

Ann falls for it, but is so impressed with what her husband does for a living that she can't keep quiet about it. Michael is so impressed with Ann's gullibility and patriotic urging of her husband Dave to do more "secret missions" that Michael sets up a date with two blondes with the promise of spending a weekend together with them.

The indiscretions cause a number of complications, including some with the real FBI, the CIA and hostile foreign secret agents.

David and Michael end in the basement of the Empire State Building as it floods. As Ann stands behind David unseen he confesses why he loves her and all is good again.

Main cast

The film also features brief, uncredited appearances by actress Cicely Tyson and comedians Wally Brown, Alan Carney, Snub Pollard, Jack Benny and Emil Sitka.

Original play

In August 1957 Krasna announced his play My Wife and I would be produced on Broadway with David Merrick. This became Who Was That Lady I Saw You With? (1958).  The play ended up being produced by Leland Hayward. In December 1957 Alex Segal signed to direct.

The play opened on Broadway at the Martin Beck Theatre on March 3, 1958.

Original Broadway cast
Peter Lind Hayes as David Williams
Mary Healy as Ann Williams
Ray Walston as Michael Haney
Roland Winters as Harry Powell 
Larry Storch as Orlov
Gregory Morton as Belka
William Swetland as Robert Doyle
Roxanne Arlen as Gloria Coogle
Virginia de Luce as Florence Coogle
Robert Burr as Evans
Stephen C. Cheng as Waiter
Pamela Curran as Second Tenant
Dan Frazer as McCarthy
Peter Gumeny as Joe Bendix
Richard Kuen Loo as Lee Wong
Frank Milan as Parker
Joan Morgan as Secretary
W. Edgar Rooney as Building Employee
Wallace Rooney as Schultz

Reception
Walter Kerr called it "an elaborate and extremely funny doodle." Brooks Atkinson of the New York Times said "the actors are more entertaining than the script... the fun gets progressively thinner."

The play ran for 208 performances.

It only had three positive reviews but managed to run three months. Hayward elected not to take the play out touring because he felt as the play involved multiple sets it was too expensive to mount.
The play was often revived. A 1965 Los Angeles production starred Dick Miller.

Lawsuit
Krasna was sued for $500,000 in a breach of trust claim by writer Valentine Davies, who contended that Krasna incorporated material from Davies' work Love Must Go On.

Davies died in 1961 but his widow continued the suit asking for $1.5 million. The case went to trial in 1962. Groucho Marx gave evidence where he said and Krasna worked on the themes of the play in their script The King and the Chorus Girl.

The first trial ended in a deadlocked jury which was discharged after three days. The second trial found for Krasna saying there was no oral agreement between him and Davies.

There was a third trial that ended in Krasna's favor. A judge ordered a fourth trial in 1972 which was dismissed when  judge ruled that Davies should have filed a complaint within two years of discovering (he believed) that Krasna used his material.

Production

Development
In July 1958 Columbia bought the film rights to the play, and hired Krasna to write the script. Hedda Hopper wrote that she hoped the three leads of the play were used instead of stars as "they took a play that wasn't that good and turned it into a great hit". However the stars Dean Martin and Tony Curtis were clients of Lew Wasserman of MCA, as was Krasna – Wasserman had packaged the project with his clients and sold it to Columbia for $350,000.

In September 1958 George Sidney announced he would make the film as part of a three-picture deal with Columbia, along with Pepe and Here Come the Brides. The production company, Ansark-Sidney, combines the names of producer Krasna (spelled backwards) and director Sidney.

In March 1959 Debbie Reynolds signed to star alongside Dean Martin and Tony Curtis.  Martin's fee at this stage was $200,000 per film. By May, Reynolds had dropped out and been replaced by Janet Leigh, he was then married to Curtis.

Shooting
Filming started 20 July 1959. Shortly after filming Leigh called it "the best role I've ever had. The girl is really important in the comedy. Quite a few important changes were made from the stage play because of the expanded movie medium... We had a real ball making the picture; we played practical jokes on each other between scenes that kept everyone in good humor. That George Sidney's a doll too."

Leigh confirmed in her memoirs that making the film "was a romp from start to finish... we really rolled with this one. The personal familiarity of the three of us allowed absolute freedom and the interplay was wild and woolly and inventive."

George Sidney was so taken with Leigh's performance he signed her to appear in Pepe, Diamond Bikini (not made), and Bye Bye Birdie.

Reception
The film was popular and earned over $3 million at the North American box office.

See also
 List of American films of 1960

References

External links
 
 
 
 
Review of play at Variety

1960 films
American spy comedy films
American independent films
American screwball comedy films
American black-and-white films
Columbia Pictures films
Films scored by André Previn
American films based on plays
Films directed by George Sidney
1960s spy comedy films
1960s screwball comedy films
1960 independent films
1960 comedy films
1960s English-language films
1960s American films